Francesco Bernardi (31 October 1686 – 27 November 1758), known as Senesino ( or traditionally ), was a celebrated Italian contralto castrato, particularly remembered today for his long collaboration with the composer George Frideric Handel.

Early life and career
Senesino was the son of a barber from Siena (hence his stage-name). He joined the cathedral choir there in 1695 and was castrated at the comparatively late age of thirteen. His debut was at Venice in 1707, and during the next decade he acquired a European reputation and, by the time he sang in Lotti's Giove in Argo in 1717 at Dresden, a commensurately enormous salary.

As with many castrati, reports of Senesino's acting were not always positive, to say the least. The impresario Count Francesco Zambeccari wrote of his performance in Naples in 1715: "Senesino continues to comport himself badly enough; he stands like a statue, and when occasionally he does make a gesture, he makes one directly the opposite of what is wanted." Of the singer's vocal abilities, however, there was no doubt. In 1719, the composer Quantz heard him in Lotti's Teofane at Dresden, and stated: "He had a powerful, clear, equal and sweet contralto voice, with a perfect intonation and an excellent shake. His manner of singing was masterly and his elocution unrivalled. … he sang allegros with great fire, and marked rapid divisions, from the chest, in an articulate and pleasing manner. His countenance was well adapted to the stage, and his action was natural and noble. To these qualities he joined a majestic figure; but his aspect and deportment were more suited to the part of a hero than of a lover."

Senesino and Handel
Following a dispute with the court composer Heinichen in 1720, over an aria in the opera Flavio Crispo, which led to his dismissal, Senesino was engaged by Handel as primo uomo (lead male singer) in his company, the Royal Academy of Music. He made his first appearance in a revival of Radamisto on 28 December, and his salary was variously reported as between £2000 and 3000 guineas: both vast sums. Senesino remained in London for much of the succeeding sixteen years. He became a friend and associate of many in the highest levels of society. He became friendly with, among others, the Duke of Chandos, Lord Burlington and the landscape designer William Kent, while amassing a fine collection of paintings, rare books, scientific instruments, and other treasures, including a service of silver made by the famous Paul de Lamerie.

Though creating seventeen leading roles for Handel (including Giulio Cesare, Orlando, and Bertarido in Rodelinda), his relationship with the composer was frequently stormy: "The one was perfectly refractory; the other was equally outrageous," according to the contemporary historian  Mainwaring. After the break-up of Handel's Royal Academy in 1728, Senesino sang in Paris (1728) and Venice (1729), but was re-engaged by Handel in 1730, singing in four more new operas and in the oratorios Esther, Deborah, and, in its 1732 bilingual version, Acis and Galatea. His antipathy to Handel eventually became so great that, in 1733, Senesino joined the rival Opera of the Nobility. Thus he came to sing alongside the great soprano castrato Farinelli, and their meeting on stage (in the pasticcio Artaserse) led to a famous anecdote of Senesino breaking character, as reported by the music historian Charles Burney. 

Both Senesino and Farinelli also appeared in Nicola Porpora's opera Polifemo in 1735.

Return to Italy and retirement
Senesino left England in 1736, and appeared in a few more productions in Italy: he sang at Florence from 1737 to 1739, and then in Naples until 1740, making his final appearance in Porpora's Il trionfo di Camilla at the Teatro San Carlo. By this time his singing style was regarded by the public as rather old-fashioned. He retired to the city of his birth, building a fine town-house there, filled with English furniture and effects - he enjoyed tea (he ran, or at least tried to run his whole household on English lines), and kept a black servant, a pet monkey and a parrot. A somewhat eccentric and difficult personality, the latter years of his life were plagued by disputes with members of his family, particularly his nephew and heir, Giuseppe.

References
Mainwaring, J: Memoirs of the life of the late G F Handel (London, 1760)

Further reading
Avanzati, E: The unpublished Senesino (exhibition catalogue: Handel and the Castrati, Handel House Museum, London, 2006), pp 5–9
 Chrissochoidis, Ilias. "Senesino's Black Boy (1725)". The Handel Institute Newsletter 21/1 (Spring 2010), [7–8].
Dean, W: "Senesino", in The New Grove Dictionary of Music, 2003
Heriot, A: The Castrati in Opera (London, 1956)  pp 91–95
LaRue,  C S: Handel and his Singers (Oxford, 1995), pp 105–124

External links
 Anecdotes and character of Senesino (from The Westminster Magazine 1777)

1686 births
1758 deaths
Castrati
18th-century Italian male actors
Italian male stage actors
Members of the Academy of Ancient Music
18th-century Italian male opera singers